
Gmina Damnica is a rural gmina (administrative district) in Słupsk County, Pomeranian Voivodeship, in northern Poland.

Villages
Gmina Damnica contains the villages and settlements of Bięcino, Bobrowniki, Budy, Dąbrówka, Damnica, Damno, Dębniczka, Domanice, Domaradz, Głodowo, Jeziorka, Karżniczka, Łebień, Łężyca, Łojewo, Mianowice, Mrówczyno, Paprzyce, Sąborze, Skibin, Stara Dąbrowa, Strzyżyno, Świecichowo, Świtały, Wiatrowo, Wielogłowy, Wiszno, Zagórzyca and Zagórzyczki.

Neighbouring gminas
Gmina Damnica is bordered by the gminas of Dębnica Kaszubska, Główczyce, Potęgowo and Słupsk.

References
Polish official population figures 2006

Damnica
Słupsk County

de:Damnica#Gmina Damnica